Sir Edward Walter Greene, 1st Baronet (14 March 1842 – 27 February 1920) was a British brewer and Conservative Party politician.

He unsuccessfully contested a by-election in the Stowmarket constituency in 1891, but was narrowly defeated by the Liberal Party candidate. He was High Sheriff of Norfolk in 1897. He did not stand for parliament again until the 1900 general election, when he was elected unopposed as Member of Parliament (MP) for Bury St Edmunds. He stepped down at the 1906 general election and did not stand again.

He was made a Baronet, of Nether Hall in the Parish of Thurston in the County of Suffolk, on 21 June 1900. After his death Nether Hall was sold by his son Sir Raymond Greene, 2nd Baronet.

Arms

References

External links 
 

1842 births
1920 deaths
Baronets in the Baronetage of the United Kingdom
Conservative Party (UK) MPs for English constituencies
High Sheriffs of Norfolk
People from the Borough of St Edmundsbury
UK MPs 1900–1906